Mina Markovič (born 23 November 1987) is a retired professional climber. She was mainly active in climbing competitions and participated in the World Cup and World Championships in lead climbing, bouldering and speed climbing, obtaining her best results in lead climbing.

Biography
Markovič began competing in 2001, and participated in the European Youth Cup in lead climbing as well as the World Youth Championships in Imst where she placed 5th in lead and 22nd in speed climbing.

In 2004, Markovič started competing in the adult category at the Lead Climbing World Cup. In 2006, she won a silver and a bronze medal in two stages of that competition. In addition to adult competitions, she continued to participate in the Lead Climbing European Youth Cup, which she won in 2005.

In September 2009, at the Rock Master in Arco, she finished 2nd behind Angela Eiter.

In 2009, 2011 and 2014, she competed at World Championships in three disciplines: lead, bouldering and speed. From 2009 to 2014, she participated in most of the stages of the World Cup in lead and bouldering, where she obtained the combined title in 2011, 2012 and 2013, due to high rankings in both disciplines.

In 2011, she outstandingly earned her first Lead Climbing World Cup over Jain Kim and Maja Vidmar, by finishing third in Puurs, second at Briançon and Boulder and first in Chamonix, Xining, Changzhi, Amman, and Barcelona.

In 2012, she won her second Lead Climbing World Cup (three victories and four second places)

In 2015, she earned both the Lead Climbing World Cup and the gold medal at the Lead Climbing European Championships.

Rankings

Climbing World Championships 
Youth

Adult

Climbing World Cup

Climbing European Championships

Number of medals in the Climbing European Youth Cup

Lead

Number of medals in the Climbing World Cup

Lead

Bouldering

Awards
 2013 Salewa Rock Award

References

External links

 
 

1987 births
Living people
Sportspeople from Maribor
Female climbers
Slovenian rock climbers
World Games gold medalists
Competitors at the 2009 World Games
Competitors at the 2013 World Games
IFSC Climbing World Championships medalists
IFSC Climbing World Cup overall medalists